Thomas Donald Karnes (September 28, 1902 – April 23, 1982) was an American football and basketball coach.  He was the tenth head football coach at Illinois State Normal University—now known as Illinois State University—in Normal, Illinois, serving for two seasons, from 1925 to 1926, and compiling a record of 5–10.
  Karnes was also the head basketball coach at Illinois State from 1925 to 1927, tallying a mark of 9–20.

In 1955, he immigrated to Brazil.

Head coaching record

Football

References

External links
 

1902 births
1982 deaths
American men's basketball players
Basketball coaches from Illinois
Forwards (basketball)
Illinois Fighting Illini men's basketball players
Illinois State Redbirds football coaches
Illinois State Redbirds men's basketball coaches
People from Fairbury, Illinois
Basketball players from Illinois